The Canada–European Free Trade Association Free Trade Agreement is a trade agreement between Canada and the member states of the European Free Trade Association (Iceland, Norway, Switzerland and Liechtenstein). Signed in Davos, Switzerland on January 26, 2008, it came into effect on July 1, 2009. The agreement is aimed at eliminating all tariffs on goods between Canada and EFTA members. 

In 1999, Canada entered into free trade negotiations with the EFTA. Negotiations concluded successfully in June 2007, and the FTA between Canada and the EFTA States was signed on January 26, 2008.  Bilateral Agreements on Agriculture between Canada and each EFTA State were appended to the CEFTA.  Both came into effect on July 1, 2009. The agreement eliminates almost all tariffs, with certain agricultural and fishery products being excluded from immediate tariff elimination.

Bilateral trade totaled $10.7 billion in 2006 (With Canadian imports from the EFTA valued at $7.6 billion and Exports to the EFTA at $3.1 Billion). Investments between the EFTA and Canada are valued at $22 billion in 2006. The agreement is Canada's first free trade agreement with any European nation.

See also 
Comprehensive Economic and Trade Agreement
Economy of Canada
Trade bloc
Economy of Iceland
Economy of Norway
Economy of Liechtenstein
Economy of Switzerland
Canada's Global Markets Action Plan
Free trade agreements of Canada
Rules of Origin
Market access
Free-trade area

References 

European Free Trade Association
European Free Trade Association
Treaties of Iceland
Treaties of Norway
Treaties of Liechtenstein
Treaties concluded in 2008
Treaties entered into force in 2009
Treaties of Switzerland